Ančerl may refer to:

 Karel Ančerl (born Antscherl), Czech conductor
 21801 Ančerl, minor planet named after Karel Ančerl